Clough Creek is a stream in the U.S. state of Ohio.

Clough Creek is named after Richard Clough Anderson Sr., who surveyed the area in 1793.

References

Rivers of Ohio
Rivers of Hamilton County, Ohio